Double Circle is a 1964 Yugoslav film directed by Nikola Tanhofer.

Plot 
Set in Yugoslavia during World War II, underground fighters fight the Third Reich and their own neighbors, who have become collaborators.

References

External links 
 

1963 films
Croatian action drama films
Croatian World War II films
1960s Croatian-language films
Yugoslav action drama films
Yugoslav World War II films
Films set in 1941
Films directed by Nikola Tanhofer
Jadran Film films
1960s action drama films